Gerdie Keen (born 29 September 1969, Wageningen) is a Dutch professional table tennis player. She competed at the 1996 Summer Olympics. She is the older sister of Trinko Keen.

Career highlights

Summer Olympic Games
1996, Atlanta, women's singles, 1st round
1996, Atlanta, women's doubles, 1st round
World Championships
1985, Gothenburg, team competition, 4th
1987, New Delhi, women's doubles, last 32
1987, New Delhi, team competition, 4th
1991, Chiba, women's doubles, last 16
1995, Tianjin, mixed doubles, last 16
World Team Cup:
1994, Nîmes, 3rd 
Pro Tour Meetings
1997, Kettering, women's singles, quarter final
1997, Kettering, women's doubles, quarter final
1998, Houston, women's singles, quarter final
1998, Houston, women's doubles, quarter final
1998, Beirut, women's doubles, quarter final
European Championships
1988, Paris, women's singles, last 16
1990, Gothenburg, women's singles, quarter final
1992, Stuttgart, women's singles, quarter final
1992, Stuttgart, mixed doubles, quarter final
1994, Birmingham, women's singles, runner-up 
1998, Eindhoven, women's singles, last 16
1998, Eindhoven, women's doubles, quarter final

See also
 List of table tennis players

References

1969 births
Living people
Dutch female table tennis players
People from Wageningen
Sportspeople from Gelderland
Olympic table tennis players of the Netherlands
Table tennis players at the 1996 Summer Olympics
20th-century Dutch women